William White Howells (November 27, 1908 – December 20, 2005) was a professor of anthropology at Harvard University.

Howells, grandson of the novelist William Dean Howells, was born in New York City, the son of John Mead Howells, the architect of the Chicago Tribune Tower, and Abby MacDougall White. He graduated with an S.B. in 1930 and obtained a doctorate from Harvard in 1934 and worked for the American Museum of Natural History. He lectured at the University of Wisconsin–Madison from 1937 to 1954, serving as a lieutenant in the Office of Naval Intelligence during World War II. He taught at Harvard from 1954 until his retirement in 1974.

He was president of the American Anthropological Association in 1951. In 1998, with his wife Muriel Seabury, Howells endowed the directorship of the Peabody Museum of Archaeology and Ethnology at Harvard.

Honors 
Howells was a member of the National Academy of Sciences and won many notable awards. He received the Viking Fund Medal in 1954; the Distinguished Service Award of the American Anthropological Association in 1978 and was honored by that association again in 1993 with the establishment of the William W. Howells Book Prize. In 1992 he won the Charles Darwin Lifetime Achievement Award from the American Association of Physical Anthropologists.

Selected works

Books

Monographs

References

External links
National Academy of Sciences Biographical Memoir
William W. Howells Craniometric Data Set

1908 births
2005 deaths
Physical anthropologists
Harvard University faculty
The Harvard Lampoon alumni
People associated with the American Museum of Natural History
People of the Office of Naval Intelligence
Members of the United States National Academy of Sciences
20th-century American anthropologists